List of archaeological sites in County Down, Northern Ireland:

 

A
Aghavilly, Cashel and souterrain, grid ref: J1514 2272
Annaghanoon, Rath, grid ref: J1152 5241
Ardgeehan, Rath, grid ref: J6231 5131
Ardglass, 15th century Merchants’ stores ‘Newark’: Ardglass Castle, grid ref: J5615 3710
Ardglass, Tower house: Margaret's Castle, grid ref: J5603 3703
Ardglass, Tower house: Cowd Castle or Choud Castle, grid ref: J5606 3705
Ardilea, Motte, grid ref: J4164 3914
Ardkeen, Motte and bailey with later tower house: Castle Hill, grid ref: J5935 5710
Ardkeen, Church and graveyard and coffin lids (2), grid ref: J5941 5670
Ardquin, Manor house and ecclesiastical site: the Abbacy, grid ref: J5580 5447
Ardtole, Souterrain, grid ref: J5638 3811 (near Ardtole Church)
Audleystown, Church and graveyard: Templecormick, grid ref: J5664 5050
Aughnafosker, Rath: Pretty Mary’s Fort, grid ref: J1485 5990
Aughnagon, Court tomb (remains of), grid ref: J1485 2556

B
Ballaghanery, St Mary’s Church, grid ref: J3887 2672
Ballaghbeg, World War II Pillbox, grid ref: J3764 3038
Ballaghbeg, Harbour: Newcastle Harbour, grid ref: J381 296
Ballaghbeg, Fish traps: Lady Annesley’s Fish Traps (2), grid refs: J3780 3016 and J3779 3060
Balleevy, Raths (2), grid refs: J1564 4442 and J1576 4484
Balleevy, Standing stone
Ballinarry, Raised rath, grid ref: J5674 4493
Ballintaggart, Standing stone
Ballintine, Rath, grid ref: J2662 6273
Ballintine, Mound, grid ref: J2629 6285
Ballintur, Court tomb, grid ref: J2247 1502
Balloo, Raised rath, grid ref: J4923 6070
Ballooly, Standing stone, grid ref: J2086 4671
Ballyalloly, Rath, grid ref: J4273 6815
Ballyalton Court Cairn, Court tomb in Ballyalton townland, grid ref: J5309 4480
Ballybeen, Standing stone: The Long Stone, grid ref: J4260 7308
Ballybeen, Mound, grid ref: J4148 7294
Ballybryan, Windmill stump, grid ref: Area of J586 663
Ballycroghan, Cooking places, Area of J538 799
Ballycroghan, Standing stone and Bronze Age burials, grid ref: J5381 8068
Ballycroghan, Cooking places – Area A and Area B, grid refs: J5393 7970 and J5383 7944
Ballycrune, Rath, grid ref: J3027 5648
Ballyculter Upper, Inscribed stone, grid ref: J5714 4725
Ballydargan, Windmill stump, grid ref: J4895 3884
Ballydesland, Large hilltop enclosure, grid ref: J1468 2170
Ballydollaghan, Mound, grid ref: J3366 6806
Ballydown and Lisnaree, Rath, grid ref: J1484 4672
Ballydugan, Bawn, grid ref: J4682 4303
Ballydugan, Raised rath, grid ref: J4556 4227
Ballydugan, World War II Pillboxes (2), grid refs: J0568 5377 and J0582 5432
Ballyedock Upper, Bullaun stones (2), grid ref: J5718 4001
Ballyferris, Shipwreck/stranding
Ballyferris, Windmill stump, grid ref: J6287 7118
Ballyfounder Rath, rath in Ballyfounder townland, grid ref: J6207 4954
Ballygalget, Church and graveyard, grid ref: J6262 5418
Ballygarvan, Kelp grid, J5870 6531
Ballygraffan, Chambered tomb: Ballygraffan Dolmen, grid ref: JJ4730 6715
Ballygunaghan, Bivallate rath, grid ref: J1385 5199
Ballyhalbert, Standing stone, grid ref: J6463 6356
Ballyhalbert, Motte, grid ref: J6470 6351
Ballyhay, Rath, grid ref: J5754 7838
Ballyholland Lower, Cashel and souterrain, grid ref: J1147 2580
Ballykeel, Large hilltop enclosure, grid ref: J2633 5325
Ballykeel, Raised rath, grid ref: J4351 4031
Ballykeel, Rath, grid ref: J1585 3235
Ballykeel (Holywood), Church: Holywood Priory, grid ref: J4013 7935
Ballykinler Lower, Raised rath and motte: Lismahon, grid ref: J4293 3891
Ballykinler Middle, Church site and graveyard, ‘Parkaneety’, grid ref: J4252 3735
Ballylenaghan, Belvoir Motte, grid ref: J3403 6984
Ballylesson, Multivallate fort: ‘Farrell’s Fort’, grid ref: J3354 6610
Ballylintagh, Raths (2), grid refs: J2892 5676 and J2769 5600
Ballylone Little, Rath, grid ref: J3823 5340
Ballylone Little, Multivallate rath, grid ref: J3778 5364
Ballyloughlin, Standing stones (2) (remains of megalithic tomb), grid ref: J3907 3423
Ballymacaramery, Rath, grid ref: J3813 5447
Ballymacaratty Beg, Rath, grid ref: J0921 3676
Ballymacarrett, Chimney stack: Sirocco Chimney, grid ref: J3480 7417
Ballymacateer, Rath, grid ref: J1250 5722
Ballymackilreiny and Derryneill, Cairn and long cist: the Cove, grid ref: J2718 4143
Ballymaganlis, Rath, grid ref: J2007 5360
Ballymaghery, Motte, grid ref: J2223 2888
Ballymaginaghy, Platform rath and souterrain, grid ref: J3104 3873
Ballymaginaghy, Standing stone, grid ref: J3088 3820
Ballymaginaghy, Cashel and souterrain, grid ref: J3098 3778
Ballymaginaghy, Rath (otherwise known as Coen’s fort), grid ref: J3033 3865
Ballymaglave North, Rath: Edenavaddy Hill, grid ref: J3605 5185
Ballymalady, Motte, grid ref: J4359 6767
Ballymartin, Cup-marked stone, grid ref: J5076 6285
Ballyministragh, Windmill stump, grid ref: J4968 6234
Ballymoney, Rath, grid ref: J1337 4837
Ballymoney, Counterscarp rath, grid ref: J2805 3405
Ballymoney, Church ruins and graveyard: Kilcoo Graveyard, grid ref: J2816 3374
Ballymurphy, Platform rath, grid ref: J3264 5475
Ballynahinch, Windmill stump, grid ref: J3713 5245
Ballynaris, Mound: Phil’s Fort, grid ref: J1786 5373
Ballynoe, Rath, grid ref: J5802 7986
Ballynoe, Ballynoe Stone Circle (area around and embracing the state care monument), grid ref: J4813 4038
Ballyoran, Standing stone, grid ref: J4434 7420
Ballyorgan, Church site: Cappel-na-Coole, grid ref: J5712 4305
Ballyphilip, Medieval and post-medieval church and graveyard: Templecraney, grid ref: J5941 5110
Ballyrenan, Rath, grid ref: J4895 4703
Ballyrickard, Motte, grid ref: J4829 7047
Ballyrogan or Mourne Park, Court tomb, grid ref: J2818 1601
Ballyroney, Motte and bailey: Ballyroney Castle, grid ref: J2162 3948
Ballyroney, Standing stone, grid ref: J2147 4005
Ballyrush, Bivallate rath, grid ref: J4333 6585
Ballysallagh, Large circular enclosure, grid ref: J2304 5173
Ballyskeagh High, Cairn: Cairngaver, grid ref: J4542 7656
Ballystokes, Cup and ring marked stone, grid ref: J5263 4577
Ballytrustan, Church and graveyard, grid ref: J1194 4983
Ballyvally, Rath: Rough Fort, grid ref: J1153 4424
Ballyvally, Rath, grid ref: J1648 2605
Ballyvaston, Open field system, grid ref: Area of J493 362
Ballyveagh More, Church site: Kimeloge, grid ref: J3445 1832
Ballyvicknacally, Motte and bailey: Dromore Mound (area adjoining the state care monument), grid ref: J2061 5317
Ballywalter, Windmill stump, grid ref: J6216 6918
Ballywalter, Church and Anglo-Norman stone coffin lids (3), grid ref: J6224 6994
Ballywillwill, Rath, grid ref: J3517 4157
Ballyworfy, Rath: Spirehill, grid ref: J2747 3753
Bangor Abbey (site of), includes Malachy’s wall, in Corporation (Bangor) townland, grid ref: J5015 8110
Barnamaghery, Standing stone, grid ref: J4528 5443
Barnmeen, Standing stone, grid ref: J1723  3302
Barnmeen, Rath: Lisnabrean, grid ref: J1696 3336
Barnmeen, Counterscarp rath, grid ref: J1835 3160
Begny, Rath, grid ref: J2975 5025
Begny, Standing stone, grid ref: J3059 5004
Black Abbey, Benedictine abbey: Black Abbey or St Andrews in the Ards, grid ref: J6083 6750
Bonecastle, Rath, grid ref: J4614 4103
Braniel, Rath, grid ref: J3883 7108
Brickland, Ring barrow: Waterhill Fort, grid ref: J1157 4060
Bright, Tower house, grid ref: J5066 3822
Bright, Corbelled pig crew, grid ref: J5063 3771
Burren, Cashel, grid ref: J3165 5170
Burren, Platform rath, grid ref: J3295 5356
Burren, Court tomb, grid ref: J1343 2251

C
Cabragh, Enclosure: Cabragh Fort, grid ref: J2967 5949
Carcullion, Enclosure, possible mill site, grid ref: J2065 2824
Cargygray, Raths (2), grid refs: J3092 5476 and J3174 5413
Carlingford Lough, 16th century artillery fort: Carlingford Block House, grid ref: J2556 0969
Carnacavill, Ecclesiastical site: Maghera Old Church, grid ref: J3722 3411
Carnalbanagh East (Moira), Mound, grid ref: J1522 6038
Carnew, Rectangular enclosure: Carnew Fort, grid ref: J2376 4643
Carnmeen, Standing stones (2), grid refs: J0825 3071 and J0807 5311
Carrownacaw, Standing stone: the Long Stone, grid ref: J5437 4639
Carrowreagh, Ring barrow, grid ref: J4382 7424
Carrowreagh, Prehistoric earthworks, grid ref: J4386 7447
Carryduff, Rath: Queen’s Fort, grid ref: J3662 6520
Caskum, Counterscarp rath, grid ref: J1199 4282
Castleboy, Church and tower house (ruins of), grid ref: J6252 5562
Castle Enigan, Cashel, grid ref: J1281 3226
Castle Espie, Shell midden, grid ref: J4971 6708
Castle Espie, Powder and explosives store, grid ref: J4930 6713
Castle Espie, Brick works, grid ref: J4954 6721
Castlereagh, Barrow, grid ref: J3788 7073
Castleskreen, Rath and motte, grid ref: J4730 4027
Castleskreen, Rectangular enclosure and souterrain, J4732 3979
Castleskreen, Rath and tower house, grid ref: J4658 4000
Castleward, Tower house: Old Castle Ward, grid ref: J5740 4985
Castleward, Standing stone, possible portal tomb remains, grid ref: J5698 4994
Castleward, 18th century formal garden layout and canal: Temple Water Canal, grid ref: J5732 5002
Castleward, Stone quay, grid ref: J5749 4973
Cattogs, Deserted settlement: New Comber, grid ref: Area of J467 685
Chapel Island (Strangford Lough), Church site and ancillary features, grid ref: Area of J554 672
Church Quarter (Dundonald), Motte, grid ref: J4180 7388
Clare, Crannog, grid ref: J0926 5293
Clarkill, Cashel and souterrain, grid ref: J3400 3828
Clarkill, Enclosure – graveyard, grid ref: J3421 3673
Clarkill, Standing stone, grid ref: J3408 3835
Clay, Raised rath, grid ref: J5105 5692
Clay, Crannog in the Clea Lakes, grid ref: J5076 5561
Clay, Tullymacnous and Tullyveery, Crannog in the Clea Lakes, grid ref: J5099 5494
Cloghanramer and Damolly, Rath: Spring Hill Fort, grid ref: J0828 2859
Clonallan Glebe, Rath: Rathturret, grid ref: J1547 1893
Clontaghnaglar, Rath, grid ref: J4376 5590
Clonvaraghan, Cashel and souterrains (2), grid refs: J3441 4115 and J3427 3953
Commons, Strongpoint, grid ref: J4984 7298
Coniamstown, Motte and bailey, grid ref: J5058 3974
Conlig, Standing stone, grid ref: J4937 7783
Coolnacran, Rath, grid ref: J1027 4282
Coolnacran, Counterscarp raised rath, grid ref: J1053 4336
Coolsallagh, Multi-ditched enclosure, grid ref: J1505 5412
Corcreeghy, Rath, grid ref: J1018 3306
Corcreeghy, Conjoined raths, grid ref: J1017 3195
Corporation (Bangor), Bangor Abbey (site of), includes Malachy’s wall, grid ref: J5015 8110
Corporation (Killyleagh), Ecclesiastical site, grid ref: J5242 5323
Corporation North (Newtownards), Windmill, grid ref: J4939 7489
Corporation, Rath pair, grid ref: J5200 5149
Cowd Castle or Choud Castle, Tower house in Ardglass, grid ref: J5606 3705
Craigavad, Mound, grid ref: J4328 8173
Craigboy, Platform rath, grid ref: J5862 7746
Cranfield, Mound, grid ref: J2717 1044
Croreagh, Rath, grid ref: J1219 2890
Croreagh, Standing stones (2), grid ref: J12172949
Crossnacreevy, Rath, grid ref: J3969 7016
Cumber, Rath, grid ref: J3910 4994

D
Damolly and Cloghanramer, Rath: Spring Hill Fort, grid ref: J0828 2859
Dane's Cast, Linear earthwork visible at several points in the following townlands:
Drumantine, grid refs: J0682 to J0689 3629 and J0679 3667 to J0862 3646
Killysavan, grid refs: J0691 to J0684 3918 and J0684 3918 to J0690 3848
Knocknanarny, grid ref: J0634 3471 to J0638 3437
Lisnabrague, grid ref: J0664 4104 to J0682 4062
Lisnagade, grid ref: Area of J086 439
Loughadian, grid ref: J0702 4006 to J0694 3969
Scarva, grid refs: J078 436 to J066 421, J074 433 to J078 436, J071 430 to J075 434 and J076 432 to J077 434
Deehommed, Cashel, grid ref: J2450 4260
Deehommed, Raths (2), grid ref: J2588 4160 and J2585 4138
Deehommed, Chimney, grid ref: J2579 4075
Demesne of Down, Mound and enclosure: Magnus Grave, grid ref: J4773 4357
Demesne of Down, Cross: Downpatrick Town Cross, grid ref: J4830 4450
Demesne of Down, Cathedral Hill, Downpatrick: earthworks and ecclesiastical site, grid ref: Area of J483 444
Demesne of Down, Motte and enclosure: Mound of Down, grid ref: J4825 4498
Demesne of Down, Standing stone, grid ref: J4850 4345
Derry, Rath, grid ref: J3025 5165
Derryboy, Rath, grid ref: J4838 5512
Derryleckagh, Church and graveyard: Templegowran, grid ref: J1279 2645
Derryneill, Raised rath, grid ref: J2720 3976
Derryneill and Ballymackilreiny, Cairn and long cist: the Cove, grid ref: J2718 4143
Donaghadee, Motte, grid ref: J5882 8009
Donaghaguy, Barrow, grid ref: J1360 2070
Donaghaguy, Standing stone, grid ref: J1416 1972
Dromore, Tower house: Dromore Castle, grid ref: J2009 5323
Dromore Mound, Motte and bailey (area adjoining the state care monument) in Ballyvicknacally townland, grid ref: J2061 5317
Dromorebrague, Large enclosure, grid ref: J1344 4164
Drumaghadone, Rath, grid ref: J2058 5049
Drumaghlis, 17th-century house, ‘The Ha’, grid ref: J4216 5118
Drumanakelly, Rath: Blackwood’s Fort, grid ref: J3915 4403
Drumantine, Rath, grid ref: J0839 3590
Drumantine, Dane's Cast linear earthwork, grid refs: J0682 to J0689 3629 and J0679 3667 to J0862 3646
Drumaroad, Cashel: White Fort, grid ref: J3653 4397
Drumbo, Round tower, grid ref: J3214 6506
Drumboneth, Rath, grid ref: J2103 5230
Drumboneth, Enclosure, grid ref: J1980 5203
Drumena, Cairn with cist: Carnbane, grid ref: J3063 3358
Drumena, Cashel, grid ref: J3089 3372
Drumgath, Graveyard and site of medieval church, grid ref: J1672 2959
Drumhirk, Rath, grid ref: J4586 6553
Drummiller, Standing stone, grid ref: J0742 3117
Drummiller, Motte, grid ref: J0833 3098
Drummiller, World War II Pillbox, grid ref: J0705 4449
Drumnahare, Standing stone, grid ref: J1105 4152
Drumnahare, Loughbrickland Crannóg in Lough Brickland, grid ref: J1113 4118
Drumnahare, Mound, grid ref: J1130 4197
Drumreagh, Raised fort or motte: Curly’s Fort, grid ref: J4358 6019
Drumsallagh, Monastic site, grid ref: J0935 4142
Drumsallagh, Rath, grid ref: J0923 4054
Dunbeg Upper, Fortification: Dunbeg Fort, grid ref: J3395 4872
Dunbeg Upper, Rath, grid ref: J3473 4845
Duneight, Motte and bailey (area surrounding the state care monument), grid ref: J2777 6078
Duneight, Rath: Todd’s Grave, grid ref: J2797 6156
Dunlady, Mound, grid ref: J4304 7420
Dunmore, Church and graveyard: Templemoyle,  grid ref: J3665 4703
Dunmore, Neolithic house, grid ref: J3643 4607
Dunnaman, Court tomb: Giant’s Grave, grid ref: J2885 1503
Dunnanew, Counterscarp rath, grid ref: J4157 4257
Dunnaval, Rath, grid ref: J2850 1293
Dunover, Motte, grid ref: J6052 7032
Dunturk, Rath, grid ref: J3593 4373

E
Edenagarry, Round cairn, grid ref: J1825 3779
Edenderry, Motte, grid ref: J3181 6806
Edenderry, Chimney (known as Edenderry bleach works), grid ref: J1209 9468
Edenmore, Cashel, grid ref: J1453 2669
Edenmore, Court tomb, grid ref: J1475 2583
Edentrumly, Rath and souterrains: Lisbane, grid ref: J1677 2693
Erenagh, Enclosure, grid ref: J4658 4083

F
Farranfad, Mound: Piper’s Fort, grid ref: J4337 4335
Finnard, Rath, grid ref: J1390 3195
Finnis, Souterrain, grid ref: J2740 4418
Fish Quarter, Fish trap: Doctor’s Bay, grid ref: J5985 6206

G
Gargarry, Standing stone, grid ref: J2887 3791
Glasdrumman, Windmill, flourmill and dwelling, grid ref: J4105 5946
Glasdrumman, Court tomb and graveyard: Killygony Graveyard, grid ref: J3768 5436
Glasdrumman, Cashel, grid ref: J3668 5487
Glebe, Cross in Donaghmore churchyard, grid ref: J1045 3495
Glenloughan, Standing stone: Cloghmore, grid ref: J0669 4452
Glenloughan, Rath with annex, grid ref: J0743 4404
Glenloughan, World War II Pillbox, grid ref: J0736 4436
Goward Dolmen, Court tomb in Goward townland, grid ref: J2374 2964
Gransha, Raised rath: Gransha Mound, grid ref: J5314 7694
Gransha, Large hilltop enclosure, grid ref: J2516 4609
Gransha, Tidal mill wall, grid ref: J5971 6054
Greenan, Mound: Dumb Fort, grid ref: J1768 5357
Greenan, Standings stones (3): Three Sisters, grid ref: J1015 4110
Greenan, Graveyard and crosses ‘Clonlea’, grid ref: J1182 2219
Greencastle, Motte, grid ref: J2429 1182
Greencastle, Church, grid ref: J2453 1181
Greengraves, Portal tomb: The Kempe Stones, grid ref: J4454 7363
Greyabbey Bay, Intertidal archaeological landscape, grid ref: J568 670
Growell, Crannog in Lough Aghery, grid ref: J2815 5336

H
Hillhall, Bawn (remains of), grid ref: J3012 6443

I
Imdel, Rath, grid ref: J1563 3734
Inch, Monastic remains outside State Care area, grid ref: Area of J477 455
Islandbane, Standing stone, grid ref: J4798 4003
Islandmoyle, Standing stone (otherwise known as the Gray stone), grid ref: J2628 3507

K
Keentagh, Complex cairn: Millin Bay Cairn (area around the state care monument), grid ref: J6288 4949
Kilbroney, Crosses (2), church and graveyard, grid ref: J1880 1954
Kilbroney, Standing stones (2), grid refs: J1870 1936 and J1864 1911
Kilclief, Motte, grid ref: J5979 4618
Kilclief, Anglo-Norman coffin lids (2) (in Church of Ireland Church), grid ref: J5960 4569
Kilkeel, Portal tomb: the Crawtree Stone, grid ref: J3075 1486
Kilkeel, Rath, reused as medieval church and graveyard: Church of St Colman del Morne, grid ref: J3070 1456
Killough, Harbour (Killough Harbour), grid ref: J5415 3633
Killysavan, Dane's Cast linear earthwork, grid refs: J0691 to J0684 3918 and J0684 3918 to J0690 3848
Kilmore, Multi-ditched enclosure, grid ref: J0855 6222
Kilpike, Rath, grid ref: J1245 4843
Kinghill, Rath and possible souterrain, grid ref: J2575 3278
Kircubbin, Harbour (Kircubbin Harbour), grid ref: J5953 6310
Kirkistown, Motte, grid ref: J6382 5753
Kirkistown, 17th century windmill, grid ref: J6411 5784
Knock, Motte: Shandon Park Motte (area surrounding the state care monument), grid ref: J3846 7277
Knocknanarny, Large enclosure, grid ref: J0671 3443
Knocknanarny, Platform rath, grid ref: J0744 3363
Knocknanarny, Dane's Cast linear earthwork, grid ref: J0634 3471 to J0638 3437

L
Lagan Navigation, canal visible at several points in the following townlands: 
Reach 1: Malone Lower, grid ref: J3397 7128 to J3407 7709
Reach 2: Malone Upper, grid ref: J3369 7018 to J3353 6969
Reach 3: Ballynavally, grid ref: J3309 6915 to J3257 6914
Reach 4: Malone Upper, grid ref: J3195 6759 to J3099 6687
Reach 5: Malone Upper, grid ref: J3068 6714 to J3055 6720
Reach 6: Ballyskeagh, grid ref: J3005 6784 to J2861 6658
Reach 7: Lambeg, Lisnatrude and Tullycross, grid ref: J2806 6636 to J2803 6466
Reach 9: Old Warren, grid ref: J2670 6336 to J2664 6333
Reach 10: Blaris, grid ref: J2600 6275 to J2594 6247
Lapnagoppoge, Navigation pillar, grid ref: J5862 4705
Lappoges, Court tomb: Giant’s Graves, grid ref: J2557 5277
Legannany, Graveyard with cross-inscribed pillar stone, grid ref: J3033 4274
Legananny Dolmen, Dolmen, grid ref: J2887 4339
Lisboy, Raised rath, grid ref: J5144 4790
Lisdalgan, Raised rath, grid ref: J3939 5980
Lisnabrague, Standing stone, grid ref: J0716 4095
Lisnabrague, Dane's Cast linear earthwork, grid ref: J0664 4104 to J0682 4062
Lisnabreeny, Rath, grid ref: J3727 6946
Lisnacree, Church site and graveyard: Tamlaght, grid ref: J2447 1461
Lisnacroppan, Mound and enclosure: barrow, grid ref: J1924 3721
Lisnagade, Rath: Lisnaweelan, grid ref: J0833 4426
Lisnagade, Rath, grid ref: J0887 4347
Lisnagade, Dane's Cast linear earthwork, grid ref: Area of J086 439
Lisnaree and Ballydown, Rath, grid ref: J1484 4672
Lisnatierny, Counterscarp rath, grid ref: J1056 3730
Lisoid, Raised rath, grid ref: J5099 3674
Listooder, Raths, grid refs: J4110 5320 and J4173 5299
Loughadian, Dane's Cast linear earthwork, grid ref: J0702 4006 to J0694 3969
Loughans, World War II Pillboxes, grid refs: J0524 2746 and J0531 4733
Loughbrickland Crannóg in Lough Brickland, in Drumnahare townland, grid ref: J1113 4118
Loughkeelan, Raised rath, grid ref: J5618 4558
Loughmoney, Portal tomb: Loughmoney Dolmen, grid ref: J5391 4635

M
Magheradrool, Church, grid ref: J3792 5127
Magheradrool, Rath, grid ref: J3829 4977
Magheraknock, Hilltop enclosure: Magheraknock Fort, grid ref: J3444 5591
Magheraknock, Rath, grid ref: J3471 5699
Magheramayo, Rath and souterrain: Big Fort, grid ref: J2965 3800
Magheramayo, Standing stone, grid ref: J2984 3841
Magherana, Rath, grid ref: J1034 5467
Magheratimpany, Rath, grid ref: J3749 4779
Mahee Castle, Tower house and bawn (area adjacent to the State Care monument), in Mahee Island townland, grid ref: J5239 6393
Mahee Island, Nendrum Monastery monastic site (area surrounding the State Care Monument), grid ref: J5245 6364
Mahee Island, Tide mill, grid ref: J5255 6375
Mahee Island, Landing place, grid ref: J524 639
Margaret's Castle, Tower house in Ardglass, grid ref: J5603 3703
Mayo, Standing stone: Long stone, grid ref: J1604 2662
Mayo, Standing stone, grid ref: J1627 2524
Mayo, Enclosure, grid ref: J1650 2525
Maze, Hangars and World War II Pillbox, grid ref: J2241 6201
Meenan, Counterscarp rath, grid ref: J0928 3967
Millin Bay Cairn, Complex cairn (area around the state care monument), in Keentagh townland, grid ref: J6288 4949
Milltown, Court tomb: Carnanbane, grid ref: J1325 2475
Moneydorragh More, Standing stone: the Long Stone, grid ref: J3539 1991
Moneyscalp, Cashel, grid ref: J3142 3441
Moneyslane, Standing stones (2), grid ref: J2538 3998
Monlough, Rath, grid ref: J3909 6514
Mount Stewart, Motte: Moat Hill, grid ref: J5635 7013
Moyad, Court tomb: Rush’s Cove, grid ref: J2878 1958
Moygannon, Raths (2), grid refs: J1615 1991 and J1609 1981
Mullaghmore, Ring barrows (2) and standing stones, grid ref: J1928 2722

N
Narrow Water, Motte, grid ref: J1291 1923
Nendrum Monastery, Monastic site (area surrounding the State Care Monument), in Mahee Island townland, grid ref: J5245 6364
Newry, Tower house: Bagnal’s Castle, grid ref: J0873 2615
Newry Canal, Canal visible at several points in the following townlands:
Reach 1 (a): Drumalane and Lisdrumliska, grid ref: J1091 2071 to J0848 2594
Reach 1 (b): Ballinlare, Lisdrumgullion and Lisdrumliska, grid ref: J0848 2594 to J0874 2743
Reach 2: Lisdrumgullion, grid ref: J0874 2743 to J0848 2806
Reach 3: Damolly, grid ref: J0848 2806 to J0773 2869
Reach 4: Carnbane and Lisdrumgullion, grid ref: J0773 2869 to J0749 2936
Reach 5: Carnmeen, grid ref: J0749 2936 to J0742 3087
Reach 6: Carnmeen and Drummiller, grid ref: J0742 3087 to J0676 3230
Reach 7: Knockanarny, grid ref: J0676 3230 to J0616 3433
Reach 8: Ballylough, Drumantine and Knockanarny, grid ref: J0616 3433 to J0648 3678
Reach 9: Aughantaraghan and Damoan, grid ref: J0648 3678 to J0675 3833
Reach 10: Loughadian, grid ref: J0675 3833 to J0613 to 3928
Reach 11: Glenloughan, Scarva, Lisnabrague and Loughadian, grid ref: J0613 3928 to J0638 4504
Reach 12: Terryhogan, grid ref: J0638 4504 to J0631 4536
Reach 13: Moyallan and Mullabrack, grid ref: J0631 4536 to J0314 5117
Newtownards, 17th-century garden, walls and canal, grid ref: Area of J491 737
Newtownards, Market Cross: Old Cross, grid ref: J4915 7403

O
Ogilby Island, Stone and wooden fish trap, grid ref: Area of J507 687
Ouley, Church site, graveyard and enclosure, grid ref: J1450 3612

Q
Quarter Cormick, Standing stone, J4728 4236
Queens Island, Thompson and Alexandra Graving Docks, grid ref: J3564 7601 and J3570 7627
Queens Island, Hamilton Graving Dock, grid ref: J3012 6443
Queens Island, Twin slipways of the RMS Titanic and RMS Olympic ships, grid ref: J3512 7543
Queens Island, Travelling cranes and building dock: Samson and Goliath, grid ref: J3582 7547
Quoile, Tower house: Quoile Castle, grid ref: J4963 4701

R
Raholp, Church and graveyard: St Tassach’s, Saul, grid ref: J5406 4788
Raholp, Chambered tomb, grid ref: J5429 4719
Rainey Island, Oyster midden, grid ref: J5270 6314
Rathgorman, Motte and bailey, grid ref: J5278 5821
Rathmullan, Raised rath and motte: Rathmullan Motte, grid ref: J4775 3736
Rathmullan Lower, Barrow, grid ref: J4816 3743
Ringbane, Rath, grid ref: J1235 3445 
Ringhaddy, Church: Ringhaddy Church (area surrounding the State Care monument), grid ref: J5381 5898
Ringhaddy, Tower house: Ringhaddy Castle, J5384 5886
Ringmackilroy, Windmill, grid ref: J1428 1822
Ringneill, Stone fish trap, grid ref: J5180 6615
Rosemount, Rath, grid ref: J5803 6766
Rossconor (Rathfriland), Tower house, grid ref: J2013 3374
Rossglass, Corbelled pig crews, grid ref: J5163 3510
Rostrevor, 18th century style grotto, grid ref: J1748 1860
Round Island, Structural complex, grid ref: J577 566

S
Saul, Ecclesiastical site: Saul Abbey, grid ref: J5097 4634
Saul, Carved stone head, grid ref: J5076 4673
Saval Beg, Standing stone, grid ref: J1205 3104
Saval More, Standing stones (2), grid ref: J1216 3119
Scarva, World War II Pillboxes (2), grid refs: J0645 4365 and J0719 4289
Scarva, Bivallate rath, grid ref: J0744 4398
Scarva, Dane's Cast linear earthwork, grid refs: J078 436 to J066 421, J074 433 to J078 436, J071 430 to J075 434 and J076 432 to J077 434
Scrabo, Hut circles, grid ref: Area of J477 726
Scrabo, Hillfort, grid ref: J4776 7260
Seafin, Castle, grid ref: J2205 3880
Seafin, Rath, grid ref: J2157 3786
Sheepland Beg, Windmill stump, grid ref: J5764 3924
Sheeptown, Motte and bailey: Crown Mound, grid ref: J1074 2791
Shrigley Mill chimney, Chimney stack in Tullyveery townland, grid ref: J5203 5390
Skeagh, Rath: Cromie’s Fort, grid ref: J2358 5018
Slanes, Church, graveyard, souterrain and enclosure, grid ref: J6372 5517
Slidderyford Dolmen, Portal tomb in Wateresk townland, grid ref: J3936 3437
Slievenagriddle, Megalithic cist, grid ref: J5295 4535
Strangford Lower, Tower: Old Court, grid ref: J5890 5002

T
Tamnaharry, Possible megalithic tomb and enclosure: Cloghadda, grid ref: J1542 2444
Tara, Rath: Tara Fort, grid ref: J6267 4850
Teconnaught, Rath, grid ref: J4321 4836
Tollymore, Rath: St Cillan’s Fort, grid ref: J3680 3195
Tollymore Park, Cashel: White Fort, grid ref: J3305 3178
Tonaghmore, Rath, grid ref: J3932 5748
Tonaghmore, Windmill stump, grid ref: J3841 5676
Town Parks (Comber), Motte, grid ref: J4480 6843
Tullyboard, Windmill stump: Portaferry, grid ref: J5995 5056
Tullycarn, Rath, grid ref: J1509 5258
Tullyear, Rath, grid ref: J1338 4489
Tullyhinan, Raths, grid refs: J1614 4864 and J1500 4776
Tullymacnous, Clay and Tullyveery, Crannog in the Clea Lakes, grid ref: J5099 5494
Tullymurry, Motte and bailey, grid ref: J4352 4182
Tullynakill, Harbour, grid ref: J5237 6348
Tullyveery, Chimney stack, Shrigley Mill chimney, grid ref: J5203 5390
Tullyveery, Tullymacnous and Clay, Crannog in the Clea Lakes, grid ref: J5099 5494

W
Walshestown, Tower house and bawn: Walshestown Castle, grid ref: J5452 4978
Walshestown, Pier, grid ref: J5448 5012
Wateresk, Portal tomb: Slidderyford Dolmen, grid ref: J3936 3437
Whitespots, Lead mine: engine-house, shaft, chimney etc., grid ref: J4918 7689
Whitespots, Lead mine: chimney of south engine-house, grid ref: J4925 7628
Whitespots, Lead mine: windmill stump, grid ref: J4936 7647
Whitespots, Lead mine: bog shaft, engine-house and ancillary structures including chimney and outbuildings, grid ref: J4930 7592
Woodgrange, Rath and tower house (area surrounding the state care monument, grid ref: J4446 4648

References
The main reference for all sites listed is: NI Environment Agency, Scheduled Historic Monuments (to 15 October 2012), unless otherwise indicated.

 
Down
County Down
Archaeological